Palagiano is a town and comune in the province of Taranto, Apulia, southeast Italy.

It is known as the "City of the Clementines" due to its production of the PGI product "Clementine del Golfo di Taranto".

References

Cities and towns in Apulia